Rajana is a town of district Toba Tek Singh, Punjab, Pakistan.
It is 15 km away from Toba Tek Singh. It is located west of Faisalabad, east of Multan, south of Toba Tek Singh and north of Kamalia and Vehari.

The closest villages are Chak No. 284 GB, Chak No. 285 GB, Chak No. 286 GB, Chak No. 360 GB, Chak No. 257 GB and Chak no 261.

A new motorway (M3) interchange has been built nearby Rajana City, which will connect Rajana City to domestic highways.

Rajana Foundation Hospital is located on Toba Road, founded by Governor Punjab Chaudhry Mohammad Sarwar.

One of the famous thing about Rajana is a Rajana Police Station (known as Thana Rajana) which is more than 100 year old, built around on 1901.Govt Degree Associate College for Girls and Boys Are Also Well known There 

Rajana has a well known forest (known among locals as jungle and zakhera) which is located on Faisalabad road.

References 

Union councils of Toba Tek Singh District